The River War: An Historical Account of the Reconquest of the Soudan (1899), by Winston Churchill. It is a history of the conquest of the Sudan between 1896 and 1899 by Anglo-Egyptian forces led by Lord Kitchener. He defeated the Sudanese Dervish forces, led by Khalifa Abdallahi ibn Muhammad, heir to the self-proclaimed Mahdi Muhammad Ahmad who had vowed to conquer Egypt and drive out the Ottomans. The first, two volume, edition includes accounts of Churchill's own experiences as a British Army officer during the war, and his views on its conduct.

The River War was Churchill's second published book after The Story of the Malakand Field Force, and originally filled two volumes with over 1,000 pages in 1899. The River War was subsequently abridged to one volume in 1902.

Background
Aware that there was a war in Sudan, Churchill was determined to be part of it. He was not alone in this, because in a time generally of peace, many British Army officers wanted experience of battle to further their careers. In Churchill's case, he did not see his career as lying with the army, but had already started writing about wars and wanted a new campaign to write about. He first attempted to obtain a transfer from his regiment stationed in India to the 21st Lancers, which was the unit taking part in the war. This was granted by the War Office, but rejected by the commander of the British force in Sudan, General Kitchener. Churchill next took leave to Britain, where he enlisted friends and family to lobby Kitchener to permit him to take part. This continued to be unsuccessful, even when the prime minister Lord Salisbury made an inquiry on his behalf. Eventually, however, his mother's friend Lady Jeune got him what he wanted - she approached her friend Sir Evelyn Wood, Adjutant General of the Horse Guards, who had authority over appointments to the regiment in England, and within two days he received an attachment to the Lancers in place of an officer who had died, on 24 July 1898. On 5 August he was in Luxor and on 24 August the regiment set out from Atbara to attack the Mahdist forces.

Before leaving London, Churchill obtained a commission to write accounts of the war for the Morning Post, producing 15 articles, which were printed in the newspaper between 23 September and 8 October 1898, for which he was paid £15 per article. This helped offset his expenses for the trip, which the War Office had declined to meet, as well as refusing any liability should he be killed or injured. The Times had two correspondents covering the war, one of whom was killed and another injured, and Churchill wrote a piece for this newspaper also, but Kitchener vetoed the sending of the report.

After the Battle of Omdurman the Lancers were ordered to return to other duties, so Churchill's personal experience of the war ceased at that point. Although Omdurman had been taken from Khalifa Abdullahi, the Khalifa himself escaped and was not tracked down and found to have been killed in the final defeat of his army for another year. A number of participants were to play important parts in the First World War. Aside from Churchill and Kitchener, captains Douglas Haig and Henry Rawlinson became generals in the war, while Lieutenant David Beatty, then commanding a Nile gunboat, became an admiral and commanded the British Grand Fleet.

Churchill returned to England to complete his leave, before returning to India for three months and finally resigning from the army. As a direct result of Churchill's writings, a rule was introduced prohibiting serving officers from also acting as war correspondents. This was one factor contributing to his leaving the army, since his earnings from writing were some five times greater than his army pay during his three years of army service.

In India Churchill visited the Viceroy, Lord Curzon, who had himself written a history of "Persia and the Persian Question" eight years before. He read everything he could find containing background information about the Sudan. On the way home he stopped for two weeks in Egypt to visit Lord Cromer, then in charge of the Egyptian government, who read through the text and made suggestions and corrections, in particular playing down the popular impression of General Gordon, murdered by the Mahdi's forces fourteen years before, as a hero. While in Cairo he spoke to Slatin Pasha, author of a work about the Sudan, Sir Reginald Wingate, Director of Intelligence on Kitchener's staff, Edouard Girouard, responsible for building railways through Egypt which allowed the British advance, and others who had played some part. Sailing home across the Mediterranean, Churchill had as a fellow passenger George Warrington Steevens, who was also a war correspondent, working for the Daily Telegraph. They had met on a couple of previous occasions, and Churchill prevailed upon him also to read the manuscript. His suggestion was to reduce the degree of philosophising that, despite the accuracy of Churchill's commentary, might bore the reader.

Content

In vivid style the book describes the background to the war, the relationship of the Upper Nile to Egypt, the murder of General Charles George Gordon in the siege at Khartoum, the political reaction in England, and Kitchener's elaborate preparations for the war. While in the Sudan, Churchill participated in the Battle of Omdurman. Churchill comments at length on the mechanisation of war with use of the telegraph, railroad, and a new generation of weaponry.

1899 unabridged, two-volume edition 

The unabridged version contains many illustrations with drawings, photogravures, and coloured maps. It also contains vivid narratives of personal adventures of the author, his views on British expansionism, passages of deep reflection about the requirements of a civilised government, and criticism of military and political leaders and religion. The first edition was reviewed by The Times, which described it as containing material sufficient for two good books and one bad one, with the bad one being the more interesting.

About Islam he wrote:

About the British attitude to war:

About the modern machinery of war and its effectiveness against native tribesmen:

Churchill spread his criticisms wherever he found fault. A passage was highly critical of General Kitchener for ordering the desecration of the Mahdi's tomb and carrying off his head as a trophy. The head was returned by the order of Lord Cromer, once he discovered what had happened. The matter was debated in parliament and led to a newspaper campaign against Kitchener as well as deepening the ill feeling which already existed between two men who as members of the British government in 1914 were expected to co-operate militarily as heads of the army and navy departments. All reference to the incident was removed from the second edition.

Criticisms extended to the supplies for the troops: British soldiers were sent out from England with boots made substantially from cardboard, which rapidly disintegrated and had to be bound with cloth or string to hold together. While the Indian Army was equipped with highly effective Dum-dum bullets produced in India, British bullets sent to Egypt were simply pointed, and 1,000,000 rounds had to have their ends filed off to increase their effectiveness. The rough remodelling meant the bullets were inaccurate at long ranges, giving soldiers a choice of bullets able to hit their target but only wound, or killing bullets which were likely to miss and could jam the guns. Railway engines needed to carry troops and supplies into Sudan had to be obtained from all over the world, since British companies were unable to supply them at short notice. By contrast, American companies could supply locomotives immediately which were more effective and cheaper than some obtained from England.

1902 abridged, one-volume edition
In 1902 Churchill had become a member of parliament. It was thought that the commentary about some of the people mentioned had better be excised in a revised edition. The book was thus edited down to one single volume, removing approximately one-third of the total.

Much of the removed content included passages in which Churchill recounted his own experiences, as he had done in other works, such as The Story of the Malakand Field Force. This removal gave the revised book a somewhat different feel to these others, and to its original form. Other removals included discussions on the ethics of warfare, Churchill's own opinions of events, and his assessment of Islam. The revised book was described as an authoritative history of the war.

Abridgements were published numerous times over the twentieth century, with increasing excisions.

A "definitive" new edition of the book, restoring it to the original two-volume text, edited and annotated by Professor James W. Muller, was published in April 2021.

Controversial modern political usage
In May 2013, Missouri State Representative Rick Stream composed and forwarded an e-mail to his House GOP colleagues. Sam Levin called the e-mail "bizarre," with Rep. Stream alleging "dangers of Islam" and quoting Churchill's controversial statements.

Also in May 2013, the Winston-Salem Journal published a commentary by columnist Cal Thomas, in which he criticized current United Kingdom Prime Minister David Cameron for his reaction following the killing of a British soldier in London, and invited him to take notice of Winston Churchill's views on Islam, some expressed in The River War.

In April 2014, Paul Weston, chairman of the far right Liberty GB party, was arrested in Winchester, Hampshire, for reading aloud passages from the book whilst standing on the steps of the Guildhall and not dispersing when ordered to do so. Weston, a candidate in the May 2014 European Elections, was quoting from a section of Churchill's book that described Islamic culture in unflattering terms.

Reception
Johann Hari criticized Winston Churchill's views in his Not his finest hour: The dark side of Winston Churchill. The author also emphasizes the significance of Richard Toye's Churchill's Empire.

In Winston’s War, author Max Hastings makes this conclusion on Churchill's views: "Churchill’s view of the British Empire and its peoples was unenlightened by comparison with that of America’s president [Franklin Roosevelt], or even by the standards of his time."

Paul Rahe argues that reading The River War is suitable for "an age when the Great Democracies are likely to be called on to respond to ugly little conflicts marked by social, sectarian, and tribal rivalries in odd corners of the world—the Arabian peninsula, the Caucasus, the Horn of Africa, the Balkans, Central Africa, the Maghreb, and the Caribbean, to mention the most recent examples— I can think of no other historical work that better deserves our attention than The River War."

References

Notes

External links
Unabridged first edition volume 1
Unabridged first edition volume 2
New York Times 1900 Review of The River War
A Churchillian Perspective on 11 September with a review of The River War
Sources
The River War at Internet Archive (scanned books)
The River War at Project Gutenberg via Online Books (1902 abridged edition)
 

Books by Winston Churchill
Books about military history
British non-fiction literature
1899 books
History books about Sudan
Works about the Mahdist War
Non-fiction books about Sudan
Books written by prime ministers of the United Kingdom